Banan is a district (srok) in Battambang Province in north-western Cambodia.

Administration 
The district is subdivided into 8 communes (khum) and 72 villages (phum).

Communes and villages

References

 
Districts of Battambang province